Jim Daly (born 1944, Adelaide) is an Australia actor, famously known for his role as Dugal in Pirate Islands.

Biography 
Daly was born in Adelaide to Vincent Daly and Aileen Dempsey. His professional career began in 1955 with Joanna Priest at The Studio Theatre, Adelaide, in a production of Britten's Let's Make an Opera. Michael Crawford debuted in the role of Sammy in the Scala Theatre production in England in 1955. He also appeared in Tosca and La Bohème produced by the Elizabethan Theatre Trust company, and in the late 1950s regularly with the live-to-air children's TV show Southern Stars, produced by Priest at Channel Nine, Adelaide.

In 1964, Daly completed a course in teaching with The State College of Victoria (Christian Brothers Training Colleges), and taught full-time in primary and then secondary schools (1965-1986) in Melbourne and South Australia, and then later again in Melbourne 1986-2010, and at La Trobe University from 2010 to the present (2020), where he teaches English to international students. Over this period he completed a BA (majoring in English Literature and French Language and Literature) beginning at Melbourne University in 1966 and completing at Adelaide University in 1970, a Diploma in Educational Administration  in 1979 and a Master's in educational administration (New England University) in 1980, then a Master of Applied Linguistics (USQ), 2010. In 2012 he began a PhD by practice-research in the Theatre and Performance Department at Monash University, where his topic is "Performing the Grotesque from Hybridity and Excess: An Investigation Sited in the Katyn massacre." He will complete  in 2021.

He introduced Drama as a subject to St Michael's College, Henley Beach. He acted with the Adelaide Repertory Company, La Mama, and The Stage Company in Adelaide, returning to acting in 1984, leaving teaching. becoming 'professional' again.  His theatre company, MOP, consisting of St Michael's old scholars was active from 1979 to 1983.  The company alternated pub shows at The Black Lion hotel in Hindmarsh and major productions. He has lived in Melbourne since 1986 and has been represented by BgmAgency for many years. A full CV can be seen in the link below (References).  He has a long list of credits across theatre, film, television, voice-over, commercials and book narration work.  His narrations include "Wednesdays with Bob", a series of interviews with Bob Hawke.  Daly combined with actress Marta Kaczmarek ("Shine") in an entertaining, long-running commercial for i-Select (an online broker including medical insurance) in which as an elderly husband he is surprised to learn that his equally elderly wife is pregnant. "Better call i-Select!" she says. He is also well known for his appearance as the track engineer Mr Wilson in the "100 Metres Track" episode of "The Games" (for the Sydney Olympics 2000) with the famous actor and satirist, the deeply-respected late John Clark.

He is a Green Room Award (Vic.) winner 1996 for "The 8:16 Vodka Syndrome", "Travesties", "The Brand New Ford" and other work, and has been nominated on many occasions; an Earphones Award Winner for his narration of Morris West's "The Lovers", published by Bolinda Audio. "Daly's portrayal of Cavanagh's Irish-Australian accent is perfect. His voice is rich, arresting, and filled with subtle nuances. He also excels at his portrayal of the wealthy American Lou Malloy, giving him a lace-curtain Irish accent--brash and with a lilt. Daly is equally adroit with Malloy's Greek friend and the aristocratic Italian accents of the Farnese family members. This is an audio experience to savor, like a good glass of wine. A great story and a great performance, rare and wonderful."  He was also nominated for Best Supporting Actor for the Maverick Movie Awards in 2009 for Don Percy's short feature "Inanimate Objects".

Daly continues to work as an actor.  Details can also be found in Showcase and in AusStage.

Publications include:
Daly, James Oliver (2019). ‘Antonin Artaud and The Grotesque.’ Ephemera, vol.2, no.3, December.  Federal University of Ouro Preto, Brazil.  
Daly, Jim (2015).  ‘The Grotesque and The Gothic in Peter King’s John Gabriel Borkman: a Reflection from the Inside.’ Australasian Drama Studies 66. April. 109–130.

Filmography (short)

Film
The Independent, 2007
Inanimate Objects (2009)

Television
Utopia, 2017, as Bert
Pirate Islands, 2003, as Dugal
Thunderstone, 1998 -2000, 
Kangaroo Palace, 1997, as Ted Rowlands
Everynight ... Everynight, 1994, as Barrett

References

External links

Australian male television actors
1934 births
Living people